Bublava is a municipality and village in Sokolov District in the Karlovy Vary Region of the Czech Republic. It has about 400 inhabitants.

Geography
It lies on the border with Germany, adjacent to the German town of Klingenthal. It is situated on the Svatava River in the western part of the Ore Mountains. The Bublavský Brook flows through the municipality.

History

The first written mention of Bublava is from 1601.

Sport
For more than 100 years, Bublava is known as a winter sports resort.

Sights
The landmark of Bublava is the Church of the Assumption of the Virgin Mary. It was consecrated in 1883.

On the Olověný vrch there is the Bleiberg observation tower. It was built in 1933. The historical building was closed in 2017 and its repair is planned.

References

External links

Villages in Sokolov District
Villages in the Ore Mountains